Richmond Shock Lacrosse is a non-profit organization based in Richmond, Virginia, running a sports program that provides opportunities to play lacrosse to all players, both boys and girls. It was established in 2003 and has become a full-time, year-round program.

History 
“The mission of Richmond Shock Lacrosse is to provide an affordable experience that promotes the development and growth of lacrosse in the Richmond and surrounding areas through education, dedication, and leadership. Their objective is to inspire and motivate players; to develop student-athletes of strong character and integrity; and to provide elite athletes with the training and skills necessary to compete at the highest levels." Richmond Shock was established in 2003 and has grown from one High School travel team to a full-time, year-round program that offers opportunities to play lacrosse to all players, both boys and girls. Co-founders of the foundation include retired head coach and President Paul Ralph and coach David Deck. Since the organization was found it has established a Board Committee for the program.

Programs 
Shock provides teams from U9-U19, and up until 2014 has fielded a high school team for competition in central Virginia. The different programs in Richmond Shock include:

 U9-15 is for elementary school ages through middle school ages.
 U19 is the high school league for lacrosse. Shock has 2 different types of teams to offer for this level, CVLL or Shock Varsity Select. Shock Varsity tryouts are held in the late fall and the team's games are held in the normal spring lacrosse season. The team competes in the VA independent league. Scores and results of the games are posted online both on the Shock Website and Laxpower.com.

Starting in 2013, shock has started the Central Virginia Lacrosse League (CVLL). CVLL is a recreational program that requires no skill, just the desire to play. CVLL is a program to build the participation of lacrosse in the Central Virginia area.

Shock summer travel teams go to various tournaments throughout the country in the summer season. Ages U11-U15 will have teams for the summer. U19 has fielded a team for the summer up until the 2014 season.

Shock runs many teams during the winter season. Richmond Shock has access to RISE indoor sports fields and holds games every Sunday; all age groups U9-U19 have teams. Every other Sunday Shock holds and free goalie clinic for children to learn goalkeeping skills.

Shock has provides camps for upcoming and developing children to build skills. Camp Shock is one of them. An article on the 2013 Camp Shock explains that children who attend will learn the proper technique, including the fundamentals of: catching, throwing, scooping, picking up ground balls, dodging, shooting, how to play attack, midfield, defense and goalie positions. Camp Shock will give each player, “both individual and group instruction on all aspects of lacrosse, including specialized positional play.” The Camp normally consists of two different groups – Group 1 is for 1st to 5th graders, while Group 2 is for 6th to 8th graders. This is based on the grade the camper has just completed. Camp Shock is held annually and encourages children to be active and learn how to play lacrosse.

Location 
Richmond Shock is a Central Virginia organization. Teams practice through Chesterfield County fields, with Rivercity Sportsplex being the main field locations. Shock travels in the summer to locations such as Pennsylvania, Maryland, and North Carolina.

No Child Left Behind 
Richmond Shock Lacrosse is a 501(c)(3) non-profit organization created to provide an affordable experience that promotes the development and growth of lacrosse in the Richmond area. Richmond Shock Lacrosse is helping to promote “No Child Left Behind”. It has established a fund to provide sport opportunities to those children who, due to financial constraints, would not normally be able to participate in sport.
To qualify for this program, families should meet one or more of the below criteria:
Families whose children are eligible for free school lunches or breakfasts
Families who have incurred significant loss of income due to severe illness or injury in the family
Families who have incurred unusual expenses due to fire, flood, storm damage, or other natural disasters
Families who have encountered other emergency situations that prevent them from being able to afford program fees.

References

External links
 Official site
 Richmond Shock Lacrosse: Mission

Sports in Richmond, Virginia
Lacrosse teams in Virginia
Non-profit organizations based in Richmond, Virginia
2003 establishments in Virginia
Lacrosse clubs established in 2003